Agraja is a 2014 Indian Kannada-language film directed by Srinandan starring Darshan and Jaggesh. Kamna Jethmalani, Sanjjanaa, Arundathi and Aadya Gowda (earlier named Poornima) played the heroines, while Sadashiva Brahmavar, Rangayana Raghu, Biradar and Achyuth Kumar played supporting roles. 
The film was produced by editor T. Govardhan under his newly established banner named, The Great Indian Movie Creators. Agraja is based on the subject of a National Film Award winning Telugu film, which was revealed to be R. P. Patnaik's Broker.

Plot
An enthralling tale on corruption and black money, the plot weaves around its two major characters, Charandas, IAS (Darshan) and Siddha (Jaggesh) and depicts their journey through the path of conflict and realization. Portray as corrupt in the beginning of the film, both Charandas, IAS and Siddha start realizing the flaw in themselves and its impact on the society at large. Thus, begins the battle of two individuals against corruption and black money with a pledge to free the society from these major evils.

Cast
 Jaggesh as Sidda
 Darshan as CharanDas IAS
 Kamna Jethmalani
 Sanjjanaa Galrani as herself 
 Arundathi as Charandas's wife
 Mansi Pritam
 Aadya Gowda as Sidda's wife
 Sadashiva Brahmavar
 Kuri Prathap
 Doddanna
 Sadhu Kokila
 Om Prakash Rao
 Suchindra Prasad as News Anchor
 Sam Styris

Soundtrack
The music was composed Nandan Raj and released by D-Beats. All Lyrics were written by Panchajanya.

Critical reception
The Times of India gave the film 3 stars out of 5 and wrote, "Though the script is crisp, too many cooks spoil the broth. Excessive twists and turns and multiple characters take away from the script. The first half leaver the viewer confused but sequences in the latter half add value to the story". Bangalore Mirror gave it a score of 2.5 and wrote, "The film's plot is no doubt appealing. However, the screenplay is gripping only in the last 30 minutes or so. The rest of the film is rather slow and a dose of adrenaline could have helped".

References

External links

2014 films
2010s Kannada-language films
2014 directorial debut films